Louis Ségura (July 23, 1889 – 1963) was a French gymnast who competed in the 1908 Summer Olympics and in the 1912 Summer Olympics. He won the bronze medal in the individual all-around in 1908 as well as the silver medal in 1912.  He was one of the first crop of competitive career gymnasts at the level of the World Championships and Olympic Games.

In addition to his two successful Olympic appearances, he was also a 3-time French World team member, helping his team to the medal standings every time at the World Championships, in 1907, 1909, and 1913. Also, he won an individual medal on Parallel Bars at the 1907 World Championships.

References

1889 births
1963 deaths
French male artistic gymnasts
Gymnasts at the 1908 Summer Olympics
Gymnasts at the 1912 Summer Olympics
Olympic gymnasts of France
Olympic silver medalists for France
Olympic bronze medalists for France
Medalists at the 1908 Summer Olympics
Medalists at the 1912 Summer Olympics
Olympic medalists in gymnastics
French people of Spanish descent
Pieds-Noirs
People from Sidi Bel Abbès
Sportspeople from Oran